Information Systems Associates FZE (commonly known as ISA) is an aviation software house serving airlines, airports and travel agents. ISA is a privately owned company formed in 2005. The company produces a computer reservation system 'under the name "aeroMART SELL", formerly AccelAero,. The company is headquartered in Sharjah, UAE and the development center is based in Colombo, Sri Lanka. Software produced includes airline, airport, e-business suites, revenue management, crew & ground operations, and holidays etc.

Technology 
ISA software is Java based and creates ways to solve web-based problems.

Products 
Under ACCELaero brand there are three main product suites, including:

aeroMART
 aeroMART SELL (Computer Reservations System)
 aeroMART WEB (IBE - Internet Booking Engine)
 aeroMART AGENT (XBE - Agent Booking Engine)
 aeroMART SERVE 
 aeroMART REWARD (Frequent Flyer Program)

aeroPORT
 aeroPORT FLY (Departure Control System)
 aeroPORT TRIM (Weight and Balance System)

aeroLINE
 aeroLINE CREW (Crew Management System)
 aeroLINE FLEET (Ground Operations System)
 aeroLINE SALES (schedule planning, operation control and disruption management)
 aeroLINE RMS (Revenue Management System)
 aeroLINE BI (Business Inelegance System)

References

Travel technology
Providers of services to on-line companies
Software companies of Sri Lanka
Transport software